Patriarch John of Alexandria may refer to:

 John Talaia, Patriarch of Alexandria in 481–482
 Pope John I (II) of Alexandria, Patriarch of Alexandria in 496–505
 Pope John II (III) of Alexandria, Patriarch of Alexandria in 505–516
 Patriarch John IV of Alexandria, Greek Patriarch of Alexandria in 569–579
 Patriarch John V of Alexandria, Greek Patriarch of Alexandria in 610–619
 Patriarch John VI of Alexandria, Greek Patriarch of Alexandria in 1062–1100

See also
 Patriarch John (disambiguation)
 John of Alexandria (disambiguation)